Jhann Marlowe Galman Pamintuan (born January 4, 1993), known professionally as Marlo Mortel, is a Filipino actor, TV host, musician, singer, songwriter, and entrepreneur, who was best known for his role as Nicolo Angelo Cortez in the morning television drama, Be Careful with My Heart and Gabriel Luna in OMG. In the novel I Love You Since 1892, he was originally introduced as Juanito Alfonso, a noble and kind-hearted love interest for protagonist Carmela. He is currently under ABS-CBN's talent management Star Magic.

Career

Beginnings (2012–2014)
Mortel entered show business in 2009 as a contestant for the 5th season of GMA Network's talent show StarStruck. At the time, he used the screen name Marlowe Pamintuan. He became one of the regular teen performers at German Moreno's "Walang Tulugan with the Master Showman", using the name John Miguel Pamintuan. In 2010 he was cast in the teen-oriented drama Reel Love Presents: Tween Hearts. There, he played the role of Uno, the best friend of Barbie Forteza's character (Bambi), who becomes romantically involved with Leslie (Lexi Fernandez). He later recorded "Wake Me Up" by Wham!, one of the songs in the soundtrack album of Tween Hearts' movie adaptation, "Tween Academy: Class of 2012", released in 2011.

Mortel got his career breakthrough after he auditioned for The X Factor Philippines in 2012. Shortly after, he was cast as Nicolo Angelo Cortez in the daytime series Be Careful with My Heart. Since then, a "loveteam" has been formed between Mortel and co-star Janella Salvador. On February 22, 2014, Mortel and Janella starred in Maalaala Mo Kayas episode "Card".Janella Salvador and Marlo Mortel paired in MMK | PEP.ph: The Number One Site for Philippine Showbiz . PEP.ph. Retrieved on 2014-03-06.

On March 24 & 28, and September 26, he joined The Singing Bee, he was the champion of the week in March 24 with 40,000 and champion of the day with 60,000, then he became the defending champion on September 26 with 400,000. But, due to prior commitments such as the filming of Be Careful with My Heart (that he has to finish for the finale starting Oct-Nov 2014), and for the upcoming show called Oh My G!, Mortel, suddenly withdraws on October 3, 2014, he also mentioned on Instagram. Because of what happened, Inah de Belen took the place. He became the defending 🏆 2 weeks & 6 days.

 Rising Stardom (2015–present) 
After his success in Be Careful with My Heart, Marlo was cast as "Gabriel Luna", the male lead of Janella Salvador's character in Oh My G!.Janella Salvador, Marlo Mortel get big break via Oh My G!. Retrieved 2015-01-14.

In a live interview on Aquino & Abunda Tonight in January 2015, Mortel revealed that he was not supposed to have as much lines in the defunct daytime series Be Careful with My Heart, but was given a bigger role due to the feedback to his tandem with Janella Salvador. He also said that he only intended to enter showbiz as a singer, and not as an actor, noting he does not consider himself good-looking compared to his contemporaries.

In March 2015, ASAP launched Marlo's newest boy group called Harana together with his co-members, Joseph Marco, Bryan Santos and Michael Pangilinan with their carrier single, "Number One". 

In January 2016, Mortel and co-star Janella Salvador were chosen as interpreters of "Mananatili," one of the top 15 finalists in the 2016 Himig Handog P-Pop Love Songs, composed by Francis Louis Salazar.

In 2019, he became one of the contestants in TNT All Star Grand Resbak in Tawag ng Tanghalan sa "It's Showtime" but was eliminated.
 
In 2020, he released his fourth composition written during enhanced community quarantine "Racing Waters" which he wrote to raise awareness of psychological and mental abuse. Later on the same year, he also released his written new single with Evelyn Cormier of American Idol Top 14 entitled "Bones". The music video was recorded separately in Manila, Philippines and New Hampshire, United States. He also joined the cast for Metro Manila Film Festival 2020 film entry "Suarez: The Healing Priest" where he played the role of news reporter.

In April 2021, Marlo released his debut single “Mahina” under Polyeast Records as well as "Bituin" On his virtual press conference, He said that he wrote the single for his friend who is currently living in Vietnam.
 Basco, Karl Cedric  "Marlo Mortel turns to music to overcome anxiety during pandemic " ABS-CBN News 5 August 2021 Retrieved: 28 August 2021 https://news.abs-cbn.com/entertainment/08/05/21/marlo-mortel-turns-to-music-to-overcome-anxiety
 

Personal life

Mortel is the only child of Merlie Pamintuan and Rommel Pamintuan. He said that he was a sickly child who had a sensitive stomach and asthma. According to him, He went nearly died due to his severe asthma when he was five years old.

Mortel has said he is academically advanced, stating that he learned to read, write, and tell time at the age of three. He earned a Bachelor of Science in Business Administration in Marketing Management at San Beda College in Alabang, Muntinlupa.

Aside from being a TV host, actor, and musician, he also has a business called "Ornstal," meaning Oriental Stones and Crystals, which sells bracelets and necklaces made of semi-precious stones and crystals.

In August 2018, his mother, Merly Pamintuan, passed away due to complications of stage 4 breast cancer which was originally diagnosed as stage 2 in 2014.Abanilla,Clarizel G."Marlo Mortel mom's dies of cancer" Inquirer.net :24 August 2018 accessed: 7 March 2021 https://entertainment.inquirer.net/290119/marlo-mortels-mom-dies-cancer

In July 2020, he revealed on his Instagram account that he had had a mental breakdown. In an interview with Philippine Entertainment Portal in 2021, he announced that he is planning to return to school to major in psychology.

Discography
Harana

MV appearances2014 MAHAL KITA PERO Janella Salvador2015 SHINE PILIPINAS! Liza Soberano ft. Enrique Gil
 I CAN Janella Salvador2016'''

 Mananatili" Music Video with Janella Salvador''

Compilation albums

Filmography

Films

Television

Reality shows

Variety shows

Accolades

References

External links

1993 births
Living people
Filipino male television actors
21st-century Filipino male singers
Filipino male models
Participants in Philippine reality television series
StarStruck (Philippine TV series) participants
GMA Network personalities
ABS-CBN personalities
Star Magic
Star Music artists
People from Muntinlupa
Male actors from Metro Manila
San Beda University alumni